Morrie is a masculine given name, often a diminutive form (hypocorism) of Morris or Maurice. It may refer to:

People
Morrie Aderholt (1915-1955), American Major League Baseball player
Morrie Arnovich (1910–1959), American Major League Baseball player 
Morrie Boyle (1910–2002), Australian rugby league player
Morrie Brickman (1917-1994), American cartoonist, creator of the syndicated comic strip The Small Society
Morrie Church (1922-1981), New Zealand rugby league coach
Morrie Elis (1907-1992), American bridge player
Morrie Ewans (1894–1971), Australian rules footballer
Morrie Goddard (1921-1974), New Zealand rugby union player
Morrie Lanning (born 1944), American politician
Morrie Martin (1922-2010), American Major League Baseball pitcher
Morrie McHugh (1917-2010), New Zealand rugby union player
Morrie Rath (1886–1945), American Major League Baseball player
Morrie or Maurie Robertson (1925-2000), New Zealand rugby league player, captain and coach
Morrie Ryskind (1895–1985), American dramatist, lyricist, writer and conservative political activist
Morrie Schwartz (1916–1995), American sociology professor, and author 
Morris Thompson (1939–2000), Alaska Native leader, businessman and political appointee
Morrie Turner (1923-2014), American cartoonist, creator of the syndicated comic strip Wee Pals
Morrie Wood (1876-1956), New Zealand rugby union player
Morrie Yohai (1920-2010), American food company executive, creator of the snack Cheez Doodles
Morrie (musician), Japanese singer-songwriter Motoyuki Ōtsuka (born 1964)

Fictional characters
Morris "Morrie" Bench, aka Hydro-Man, a Marvel Comics villain

See also
the title heroine of the Scottish ballad "Eppie Morrie"
Morrie's law, in mathematics
Maurie, another given name
Maury (disambiguation)
Morey (disambiguation), includes list of people with surname Morey
Morrey, surname

English-language masculine given names
Hypocorisms